Arete (Greek: Ἀρετή) is a term meaning "virtue" or "excellence".

Arete, Arête, or Areté may also refer to:

History
Arete of Cyrene, a 4th-century BC Greek philosopher
Arete (daughter of Dionysius), daughter of Dionysius I of Syracuse and wife of Dion (tyrant of Syracuse)

Mythology
Queen Arete (mythology), a character in Homer's Odyssey

Science
197 Arete, an asteroid
 Arete, a genus of snapping shrimps in family Alpheidae

Geography
Arête, a thin ridge of rock formed by glaciers
Arête, in climbing, an outward-facing corner between two steep faces

Art
Areté, an arts magazine

Fiction
Princess Arete, a 2001 animated Japanese film and its title character

Locations
Placenames normally transliterated Areti
Areti, Cyclades, a village on the island of Milos, Cyclades
Areti, Elis, a village in Elis
Areti, Ioannina, a village in the Ioannina regional unit
Areti, Thessaloniki, a village in the Thessaloniki regional unit

See also
 Aretes (Greek: Ἀρέτης), Macedonian General

Greek feminine given names